This is a list of former frigates of the Finnish Navy:

Riga class 
Hämeenmaa (1964 - 1987)
Uusimaa (1964 - 1979)

Bay class 
Matti Kurki (1962-1975)

Finnish